Mahi Lal was an Indian politician. He was elected to the Lok Sabha, the lower house of the Parliament of India from Bijnor, Uttar Pradesh as a member of the Janata Party.

References

External links
 Official Biographical Sketch in Lok Sabha Website
1920 births
1990 deaths
Janata Party politicians
Lok Sabha members from Uttar Pradesh
India MPs 1977–1979